Cryptocercus garciai is a species of wood roach named after American musician Jerry Garcia.<ref name=":0">[https://www.jstor.org/discover/10.2307/25085925?uid=3738032&uid=2129&uid=2&uid=70&uid=4&sid=21101943665857 Burnside, C.A., P.T. Smith and S. Kambhampati, 1999. "Three New Species of the Wood Roach, Cryptocercus (Blattodea: Cryptocercidae), From the Eastern United States." The Kansas Journal of Entomology''']</ref> It was discovered by Drs. Craig A. Burnside and Srinivas Kambhampati in 1998 in the Chattahoochee National Forest in northern Georgia. Prior to this, it was assumed that Cryptocercus punctulatus'' was the only species in the genus that existed in North America.

See also
 List of organisms named after famous people (born 1900–1949)

References

Cockroaches
Insects described in 1998
Jerry Garcia